Healthcare standards in Qatar are generally high. Qatari citizens are covered by a national health insurance scheme, while expatriates must either receive health insurance from their employers, or in the case of the self-employed, purchase insurance. Qatar's healthcare spending is among the highest in the Middle East, with $4.7 billion being invested in healthcare in 2014. This was a $2.1 billion increase from 2010. The premier healthcare provider in the country is the Hamad Medical Corporation, established by the government as a non-profit healthcare provider, which runs a network of hospitals, an ambulance services, and a home healthcare service, all of which are accredited by the Joint Commission.

History
Before oil was discovered, healthcare consisted of traditional medicine: barbers performed circumcisions and other minor procedures, and herbalists dispensed natural remedies. Cauterization was a prominent practice in folk medicine. Before embarking on a pearl diving trip, a sailor would often be cauterized to prevent ear problems from developing. The practice was also used to cure a number of illnesses. Abdulaziz bin Ahmed Al Thani, a state official during the 1930s and member of the ruling family of Qatar, was noted for his curing of illnesses by using cauterization. Cupping therapy was also a prominent feature of folk medicine. It was commonly used in conjunction with herbal therapy, a form of treatment which utilized traditional herbs in Islamic medicine. Bitter aloe was the most prized herb. Other natural remedies used by Qataris include incense, thyme and saffron. Locusts were also venerated for their purported healing abilities in local nomadic culture and were considered a delicacy because of their nutritious properties, leading to their additional use as livestock feed. Of all the forms of folk medicine, herbal therapy was the most popular. Traditional practices were seldom documented, instead being passed down through oral methods.

In 1943, Sheikh Abdullah bin Jassim opted to establish the country's first hospital in order to provide treatment for his son, Hamad bin Abdullah. Prior to this, Qatari residents had to travel abroad in order to receive treatment for more severe illnesses, most typically going to the American Mission hospitals in Kuwait, Oman, or Bahrain, or to Iran. Because of Abdullah bin Jassim's lack of resources, he sought help from the British political resident in Qatar. The representative rejected his proposal, and he turned to the American Mission, who agreed to help fund and construct a hospital. The hospital opened in 1947 with a 12-bed capacity and was staffed by a single doctor from the American Mission, who was rotated on a recurrent basis. By 1948, it was visited by approximately 75 out-patients per day. The American Mission ceased sending staff members to the hospital in the late 1940s or early 1950s, and as a result, the government assumed full responsibility for its operation. Al Rumailah Hospital, the first government hospital in the country, was founded in 1957. Plans for its establishment were drawn up in the early 1950s and the patent for its design was awarded by the Royal Institute of British Architects to two British architects in 1952.

The development of social services, including health care, accelerated after the accession in 1972 of Khalifa bin Hamad, who dramatically altered the allocation of oil revenues. This included transferring the ruler's 25 percent of oil revenues to the state budget. However, the health budget soon suffered because of the downturns in oil revenues. In 1986, for example, there were cuts of 10 percent in clinic staff.

Development
Development in healthcare was expedited in the mid-1900s after the country saw considerable monetary returns from the oil industry re-allocated into the expansion of the healthcare system. Currently, health coverage is nationwide. Qatar has made developing a world class public health system one of its key goals through its National Vision 2030 initiative.

In June 2009, in order to home in on collaboration amongst healthcare professionals, the Qatar Interprofessional Health Council was formed. This would lead to the implementation of Interprofessional Education (IPE) into existing healthcare programs at various schools.

In 2012, the country announced its plans to introduce a universal health care system. The universal health care program has five stages, to be fully implemented by 2015. In the  2014 GCC Healthcare Report released by Alpen International, Qatar's healthcare sector was ranked as the fastest growing in the GCC.

The Supreme Council of Health, which oversees the health sector, announced the "Qatar Health Facilities Master Plan" (QHFMP) program in 2014. As part of the program, as many as 48 healthcare infrastructure projects are set to be developed in Qatar by 2020. It is intended to foster competition between state and private health providers. A Qatar Medical Research Council has been established.  The Sidra Medical and Research Center, planned to open in 2017 is to translate research into practical treatments.

The Medical School at Qatar University is to open in 2015.  The Weill Cornell Medical College in Qatar has been training clinicians since 2002.  About 10% of the healthcare workforce are Qataris.

Seha
The government has established the National Health Insurance Company which manages and operates Seha, the national health insurance scheme. From July 2013 it has covered Qatari females aged 12 and above for gynaecology, obstetrics, maternity and related women’s health conditions. From 30 April 2014, it provides comprehensive insurance coverage to Qatari nationals for basic health care needs, which includes almost all medical, dental and optical treatment except cosmetic surgery, alternative medicine and over-the-counter drugs.

It was intended to extend the scheme to foreign workers from 2016.  But, this was dropped in late 2015 due to it becoming too expensive.

Infrastructure

In 2010, spending on healthcare accounted for 2.2% of the country's GDP; the highest in the Middle East. In 2006, there were 23.12 physicians and 61.81 nurses per 10,000 inhabitants. The life expectancy at birth was 82.08 years in 2014, or 83.27 years for males and 77.95 years for females, rendering it the highest life expectancy in the Middle East. Qatar has a low infant mortality rate of 7 in 100,000.

In 2006, there were a total of 25 beds per 10,000 people, and 27.6 doctors and 73.8 nurses per 10,000 people. In 2011, the number of beds decreased to 12 per 10,000 people, whereas the number of doctors increased to 28 per 10,000 people. While the country has one of the lowest proportions of hospital beds in the region, the availability of physicians is the highest in the GCC.

Hospitals
, Qatar had four public and five private hospitals.

Sidra Medical and Research Center is set to be the first of its kind in the Middle East region. Endowed with $7.9 billion by Qatar Foundation, it is a large-scale project designed with state-of-the-art healthcare and education facilities intended to provide health services to the whole GCC region.

Hamad Medical Corporation (HMC), affiliated with Cornell University, is the premier non-profit health care provider in the country. Established in Doha in 1979 by Amiri decree, HMC manages six highly specialised hospitals and a health care centre: Hamad General Hospital, Rumailah Hospital, Women’s Hospital, Psychiatric Hospital, Al Khor Hospital,Al Wakra Hospital and the Primary Health Care Centre. It also runs the national ambulance service and a home healthcare service.  There are about 500,000 visits to the emergency room each year.

The main private hospitals in the country are Al Ahli Hospital, Doha Clinic Hospital, Al Emadi Hospital, and The American Hospital.

Aster Medical Centre, a division of Aster DM Healthcare, has completed more than 13 years of care in Qatar, in line with the motto ‘We Will Treat You Well’. Aster DM Healthcare, the Dubai-based Healthcare conglomerate expanded their operations network to Qatar in the year 2003 and now operates six medical centres, six pharmacies and one diagnostic centres in various parts of the country. The Aster Clinics and pharmacies are located at residential and business districts including C - Ring Road, Old Al ghanim, Al Hilal, Al Rayyan, Al Khor and Industrial area. New 50 bedded Aster hospital, the first expatriate’s hospital in Qatar will be start working by the mid of 2016.

Reem Medical Center-Doha is a medical and Dental facility located in the heart of Doha, near Souq Waqif & Msheireb Downtown Doha. This facility provides Medical services and Advanced dentistry in the line with the motto" Your health deserves the best" : Reem Medical Center services and facilities are according to international standards set by the Ministry of Public Health.

Souq Waqif Falcon Hospital, nestled in one corner of the main square in Doha’s old city, is entirely dedicated to treat falcons – Qatar’s national bird and favourite family pet. The hospital, which has been subsidized by Sheikh Tamim bin Hamad Al Thani, is set over multiple floors and over 150 falcons are treated each day.

Administration
Created in 2005, the Supreme Council of Health (SCH) is responsible for regulating Qatar's healthcare system. In December 2015, the council published the first patients' right charter in the country.

Healthcare in Qatar continues to grow which has led to more spending. The number of healthcare workers has reached over 11,000. As the development of the healthcare system in Qatar grows, the administration is also undergoing improvements to offer a more global standard of patient care. Incorporating Interprofessional Education (IPE) the administrative members learn to be more collaborative with each other. After IPE, the overall care for the patient was improved and the hospital personnel became more efficient. Existing healthcare professionals in Qatar will learn and implement IPE over time; new healthcare professionals will learn IPE before becoming licensed.

Cultural norms in Qatar make it difficult for women to become healthcare workers. Men in Qatar, husbands and fathers, are more reluctant of the women in their lives to pursue nursing. However, those who enter the nursing field, nearly 93% are very satisfied with their career choice. Although satisfied, the burnout rate is 12.6% with higher female burnouts than male.

See also
 Health in Qatar
 List of hospitals in Qatar

References

Health in Qatar
Qa